Peter A. Pettalia (August 9, 1955 – September 12, 2016) was a member of the Michigan House of Representatives, first elected in 2010 and re-elected to a second term in 2012. His district consisted of Presque Isle, Alpena, Alcona, Iosco, and part of Cheboygan counties. Pettalia owned an auto repair business; he also was involved with the rental cabin business. Pettalia lived in Presque Isle, Michigan. He was killed in a motorcycle accident on September 12, 2016.

References

1955 births
2016 deaths
Republican Party members of the Michigan House of Representatives
Businesspeople from Michigan
Politicians from Detroit
People from Presque Isle County, Michigan
Road incident deaths in Michigan
Motorcycle road incident deaths
21st-century American politicians
20th-century American businesspeople
21st-century American businesspeople